Broke is a 2016 Australian drama film, from Queensland production house Scope Red. The film is produced by Luke Graham and directed by Heath Davis. It is based on the ups and downs of Rugby League  and was shot on location in Gladstone, Queensland.

It won a Film Jury Award for Best Screenplay at the 2016 SENE Film, Music and Art Festival.

The soundtrack to Broke contains artists such as Darren Hanlon, Sam Shinazzi and The Holy Soul.

Cast
Steve Bastoni ... Sherro
Brendan Cowell ... Kirk
Max Cullen ... Cec
Steve Le Marquand ... Ben Kelly
Claire van der Boom ...  Terri
Damian Hill ... Lionel
Pippa Grandison ... Duty Manager

References

External links

2016 films
Films set in Queensland
Films about alcoholism
Australian sports drama films
2010s sports drama films
2016 drama films
2010s English-language films